The 2021 League of Ireland Premier Division, known as the SSE Airtricity League Premier Division for sponsorship reasons, was the 37th season of the League of Ireland Premier Division, the top Irish league for association football clubs since its establishment in 1985. Shamrock Rovers were the defending champions, having won their sixth league title the previous season. Shamrock Rovers went on to retain the title.

Impact of the COVID-19 pandemic 
Due to the impact of the COVID-19 pandemic on sports in the Republic of Ireland, the FAI met with the National League Executive Committee on 2 January 2021 and a decision was reached to move the start date for the Premier Division until at least 19 March 2021.

Teams 
Ten teams compete in the league – the top eight teams from the previous season and the two teams promoted from the First Division. The promoted teams are Drogheda United and Longford Town, after respective top flight absences of four and five years. They replaced Cork City (relegated after nine years in the top flight), and Shelbourne (relegated via play-off after only a year back in the top flight).

Stadiums and locations

Personnel and kits 

Note: Flags indicate national team as has been defined under FIFA eligibility rules. Players may hold more than one non-FIFA nationality.

Managerial changes

League table

Standings

Positions by round

The table lists the positions of teams after each week of matches. In order to preserve chronological evolvements, any postponed matches are not included in the round at which they were originally scheduled but added to the full round they were played immediately afterward.

Results
Teams will play each other four times (twice at home, twice away).

Matches 1–18

*Note Sligo Rovers were awarded a 3–0 victory by the FAI after Waterford opted out of playing the game due to COVID-19 cases in their squad.

Matches 19–36

Season statistics

Top scorers 
Last updated after fixtures on 19 November 2021.

Clean sheets
Last updated after fixtures on 19 November 2021.

Play-offs

First Division play-off Semi-finals

First leg

Second leg

First Division play-off Final

Promotion/relegation play-off

Awards

Monthly awards

Annual awards

See also 

 2021 President of Ireland's Cup
 2021 FAI Cup
 2021 League of Ireland First Division
 2021 Bohemian F.C. season
 2021 Dundalk F.C. season
 2021 St Patrick's Athletic F.C. season

References

External links 
 Soccerway
 UEFA

 
1
League of Ireland Premier Division seasons
1
Ireland
Ireland
League of Ireland Premier Division, 2021